The Hellenic Electricity Distribution Network Operator ( was formed by the separation of the Distribution Department of Greece's Public Power Corporation in order to comply with the 2009/72/EC EU Directive relative to the electricity market organization. The mission of this company is to undertake the tasks of the Distribution Network Operator of Greece.

It is a 100% subsidiary of PPC, however, it is independent in operation and management, retaining all the independence requirements that are incorporated within the above mentioned legislative framework.

The electricity distribution network of Greece consists of:

 111,130 km of Medium Voltage Network (data of year 2015).
 125,160 km of Low Voltage Network  (data of year 2015).

See also

 Energy in Greece

References

External links

Electric power companies of Greece
Electric power distribution network operators